Neptunella is a fungal genus in the family Halosphaeriaceae. It is a monotypic genus, containing the single species Neptunella longirostris, described as new to science in 1956.

References

Microascales
Monotypic Sordariomycetes genera